Murga Island is an island of the Andaman Islands. It belongs to the North and Middle Andaman administrative district, part of the Indian union territory of Andaman and Nicobar Islands.

History
Murga is the only historical island of the Interview group. It holds a gravesite for several British sailors.

Geography
The island belongs to the Interview Group and is situated to the west of Austen Strait which separates North Andaman Island and Middle Andaman Island. it is the biggest island in Interview Sound.

Administration
Politically, Murga Island, along neighboring Interview Group Islands, is part of Mayabunder Taluk.

References 

Islands of North and Middle Andaman district
Islands of the Bay of Bengal
Interview Group
Uninhabited islands of India
Islands of India